Cantú syndrome is a rare condition characterized by hypertrichosis, osteochondrodysplasia, and cardiomegaly. Less than 50 cases have been described in the literature;  they are associated with a mutation in the ABCC9-gene that codes for the ABCC9-protein.

Signs and symptoms

The main features of this condition are hypertrichosis, osteochondrodysplasia, and cardiomegaly. There is also a characteristic facies. Other features include patent ductus arteriosus, congenital hypertrophy of the left ventricle, and pericardial effusions.

Neurodevelopmental outcome appears normal, but obsessive traits and anxiety have been reported. It may also be associated with recurrent infections with low immunoglobulin levels and gastric bleeding, and additional possible associations include lymphoedema and heterochromia iridis.

Cause
Cantú syndrome apparently is inherited in an autosomal dominant fashion and appears to be affected by the ABCC9 gene. ABCC9 gene provides a blueprint for creating the sulfonylurea receptor 2 in the human body. The gene is located on short arm of chromosome 12 (12p12). Mutations in another gene (KCNJ8) has also been associated with this disorder. Both genes encode in ATP sensitive potassium (KATP) channel subunits. This second gene is also located on the short arm of chromosome 12 (12p12.1).

Mechanism
In terms of the mechanism of Cantú syndrome, mutations in the ABCC9 gene total 25/31. Physiologically, sulfonylurea receptor 2 is significant in vascular relaxation.

An increase in O2 tension after birth, plus decreasing PGE2 (a common prostaglandin) causes inhibition of voltage-gated potassium channels and contraction of smooth muscle (in ductus).

Diagnosis

This condition can be diagnosed by genetic testing. Furthermore, an echocardiogram and X-ray may help in the diagnosis.

Differential diagnosis
The differential diagnosis of this condition consists of the following:
Hypertrophic cardiomyopathy
Beckwith-Wiedemann syndrome
Berardinelli-Seip congenital lipodystrophy

Treatment
The treatment/management for Cantú syndrome is based on surgical option for patent ductus arteriosus in early life and management of scoliosis via bracing. Furthermore, regular echocardiograms are needed for the individual who has exhibited this condition.

History

This condition was described in 1982 by Cantú et al.

See also 
 Atrichia with papular lesions
 List of cutaneous conditions

References

Further reading
  Retrieved 2017-04-01

External links 

Genodermatoses
Rare syndromes
Syndromes affecting the heart